Ralph Duane "Hoot" Gibson (November 7, 1924 – January 2, 2009) was an American flying ace of the Korean War. He became the nation's third jet fighter ace with a total tally of five downed MiG-15 fighters. He also flew in the Vietnam War, and was a former lead pilot for the United States Air Force Thunderbirds.

Early life
Gibson was born in 1924, in Keensburg, Illinois and raised in Mt. Carmel. He entered United States Army Air Forces flight school in 1943 and graduated the next year. Gibson did not participate in World War II becoming a second lieutenant later in 1946 while participating in the occupation of Japan.

Korean War
Gibson requested combat duty at the onset of the Korean War in 1950. He flew the F-86 Sabre with the 4th Fighter-Interceptor Wing based at Kimpo Air Base in South Korea. Having been promoted to first lieutenant, Gibson entered the war with the advantage of some 1,792 hours of pilot in command fighter time. Gibson's tally began on June 18, 1951, with the downing of two MiG-15 fighter aircraft. He was credited with two further kills on July 11 and September 2, and his last on September 9. The fifth kill earned him the status of ace. By this time he had been awarded the Silver Star twice, and by the end of the war he had flown 94 combat missions.

After Korea
After the Korean war ended in 1953, Gibson transitioned to the F-100 Super Sabre and later the F-4 Phantom II. As a lieutenant colonel, he commanded the 433rd Tactical Fighter Squadron (part of the 8th Tactical Fighter Wing) based at Ubon Air Base in Thailand, and flew 105 combat missions during the Vietnam War from 1967 to 1968. He also had two tours in West Germany and a tour as the leader of the United States Air Force Thunderbirds. He was promoted to colonel in 1968 and retired in 1974.

Final years
After retirement Gibson was inducted into the Illinois Military Aviation Hall of Fame, and he started a successful second career selling real estate in Tucson, Arizona. Having established himself in the state, he was further honoured with an induction into the Arizona Aviation Hall of Fame. Gibson died on January 2, 2009, after falling and striking his head while showing property to prospective buyers. He was 84.

Awards and decorations

He was a command pilot. His military decorations and awards include the Silver Star with oak leaf cluster, Legion of Merit, Distinguished Flying Cross with two oak leaf clusters with 'V' device, Air Medal with 12 oak leaf clusters and Air Force Commendation Medal.

  Small Arms Expert Marksmanship Ribbon

  Republic of Korea Presidential Unit Citation

  Republic of Vietnam Gallantry Cross

  United Nations Service Medal

  Vietnam Campaign Medal

  Korean War Service Medal

See also
List of Korean War air aces

References

1924 births
2009 deaths
American Korean War flying aces
United States Air Force personnel of the Vietnam War
Aviators from Illinois
People from Wabash County, Illinois
Military personnel from Tucson, Arizona
Recipients of the Silver Star
Recipients of the Distinguished Flying Cross (United States)
Recipients of the Legion of Merit
Recipients of the Air Medal
United States Air Force officers
United States Air Force Thunderbirds pilots
United States Army Air Forces officers
People from Mount Carmel, Illinois
Military personnel from Illinois